Varanda may refer to:
 Historic name of Martuni Region of Nagorno-Karabakh
 Fizuli Rayon, Azerbaijan
 Qaradağlı, Khojavend, Azerbaijan